Garrard may refer to:

Garrard (surname)
Garrard (automobile)
Garrard, Kentucky
Garrard County, Kentucky

See also
Garrard Engineering and Manufacturing Company 
Garrard & Co, jewellery company